Time for School, also known as Time for School: 2003-2016 is a documentary series airing in the United States on PBS. It follows the lives of several children starting school in different areas of the world, some of whom live in areas where receiving such an education can be difficult. The documentary series spans a period of several years and is set in Afghanistan, Benin, India, Brazil, and Kenya. Time for School is also available on BBC iPlayer for over a year.

References

Further reading

External links
 

2003 American television series debuts
2016 American television series endings
2000s American documentary television series
2010s American documentary television series
PBS original programming